Iced may refer to:

 Iced (film), a 1988 American slasher film
 Iced, a 1993 novel by American author and actor Ray Shell
 "Iced" (CSI), a television episode
 Iced (toolkit), a cross-platform GUI toolkit for Rust
 Iced!, a 2008 immigration-simulation video game
 International Conference on Engineering Design, organised by the Design Society

See also 
 
 Freezing
 Ice
 Icing (disambiguation)